Nedra stewarti is a moth in the family Noctuidae. It is found in California and Oregon.

External links
New Lepidoptera Records for the Blue Mountains of Eastern Oregon

Xyleninae
Moths of North America
Fauna of the Sierra Nevada (United States)
Fauna of the Great Basin